Stella Taylor (1929 – February 11, 2003) was an English-born American long-distance swimmer, best known for crossing the English Channel twice and holding Guinness Book of Records recognition (1974 to 1994) as the oldest woman to swim across the Channel.

Biography 
Taylor was born in 1929 in England. The first vocation she pursued was as a nun, and she spent four years at Sisters of Mercy Convent in Buffalo, New York, in preparation for a life in the convent, but she never took her final vows. Still, she became known by the nickname "swimming nun."

In the early 1960s, Taylor moved to Fort Lauderdale, Florida, where she would spend the rest of her life. There she met the former executive director of the International Swimming Hall of Fame, who convinced her to pursue marathon swimming. Years later she would be inducted into that Hall of Fame as an Honor Swimmer in 1982.

In 1969, she was given the Greta Andersen Trophy (awarded by the famed Danish swimmer), for being "the outstanding first-year woman swimmer on the World Professional Marathon Swimming Federation circuit." Another marathon swimmer of that time, Diana Nyad, won the same award the following year.

Professionally, Taylor taught at the Fort Lauderdale Oral School and worked as a pool manager at Coral Ridge Country Club and Nova High School. She died in 2003 aged 73 in Fort Lauderdale from complications of a brain tumor.

Selected swims 

Taylor made many notable marathon swims.

 On August 10, 1973, Taylor swam the English Channel southward from England to France in 15 hours, 25 minutes earning her notoriety as the oldest woman to swim across the Channel. She did it again on August 6, 1975, in 18 hours, 15 minutes.
 In 1977, Taylor completed the night-time Lake George marathon solo swim in 26 hours 51 minutes. The 32-mile (51.5 km) swim commemorates the first lake-crossing swim in 1958 by Diane Struble, a 25-year-old single mother.
 On August 16, 1978, Taylor made an unsuccessful attempt to swim the Atlantic Ocean from Bahamas to Palm Beach, Florida but had to stop just a few miles short of her goal when the tides turned against her. She was swimming strongly, 70 strokes to the minute, but was repeatedly forced to seek shelter in the boat that was escorting her because of prowling sharks. She attempted that swim a total of three times.
 In 1981, she swam 40 miles across Lake Okeechobee from Moore Haven to Belle Glade, Florida.
 In 1981, Taylor swam the 24 miles across Scotland's Loch Ness in 18 hours, 58 minutes. After she finished, she said, "Something big touched [my] foot at the start... The water was 45-48°F (7.2-8.8°C)…I had five pounds of grease on to keep warm. Loch Ness is the hardest swim I’ve ever done and I will probably swim the Irish Sea next year.”
 *In 1982 in Fort Lauderdale at age 52, Taylor entered the pool at the International Swimming Hall of Fame at 10 p.m. on a Tuesday in April 1982. She swam laps in the 55-yard pool and remained there swimming until Friday afternoon at 3 p.m. for a total of 65 hours. In total, she had swum the length of the pool and back 3,120 times for an estimated 175 miles, thus breaking her previous record."

References

External links 

 Channel Swimming Association

1929 births
2003 deaths
American female swimmers
American long-distance swimmers
People from Fort Lauderdale, Florida
English Channel swimmers
20th-century American women
Deaths from brain cancer in the United States
21st-century American women